Daisychain Reaction is the second album by American alternative rock band Poster Children.  It was originally released in 1991 on Twin/Tone Records, and reissued by Sire/Reprise in 1992.  It was out of print until 2016 when a 25th anniversary edition was released on vinyl by Lotuspool Records.  The album also spawned the band's first-ever music video, for "If You See Kay".

Track listing
 "Dee" – 4:06
 "Cancer" – 2:24
 "If You See Kay" – 2:50
 "Love" – 2:51
 "Freedom Rock" – 2:34
 "Space Gun" – 5:12
 "Water" – 4:07
 "Want It" – 1:37
 "Carver's" – 3:00
 "Chain Reaction" – 4:40
 "Frustration" – 1:58
 "Where We Live" – 4:43

Personnel
Poster Children
Rick Valentin – vocals, guitar
Rose Marshack – bass, vocals
Jeff Dimpsey – guitar
Bob Rising – drums

Credits
Steve Albini – Engineer
Jay Miller – cover art

References

Poster Children albums
1991 albums
Reprise Records albums
Albums produced by Steve Albini